Annie Pearson, Viscountess Cowdray, GBE (née Cass; 4 June 1860 – 15 April 1932) was an English society hostess, suffragist and philanthropist. She was nicknamed the "Fairy Godmother of Nursing" due to her financial patronage of the Royal College of Nursing and her work to promote district nursing throughout England and Scotland. She served as the President of the Women's Liberal Federation from 1921 until 1923 and was also the Honorary Treasurer of the Liberal Women's Suffrage Union. She was the only woman to hold the office of High Steward of Colchester, serving from 1927 until her death in 1932.

Biography 
Annie Pearson (née Cass) was born in Bradford, West Yorkshire  on 4 June 1860 to Sir John Cass, a merchant and landowner from Yorkshire, and Hannah Gamble. In 1881 she married Weetman Pearson, a third generation building contractor and engineer who would run the global engineering firm Pearson and Sons, with major projects in England, Canada, the United States, Mexico, and the Sudan.  In the early 1900's Pearson would become an oil magnate, initially with his company Mexican Eagle Oil in Veracruz, Tabasco, and Campeche on the Mexican Gulf Coast.   He also owned silver mines in Bolivia. He was created a baronet in 1894, raised to the peerage becoming Baron Cowdray in 1910, and Viscount Cowdray in 1917.

She and her husband donated Cowdray Hall to the city of Aberdeen. In 1919 they moved into Dunecht House. The couple had four children: Harold Pearson, 2nd Viscount Cowdray, Bernard Clive Pearson, Francis Geoffrey Pearson, and Gertrude Denman, Baroness Denman. Her husband died in 1927. Her daughter, Lady Denman, was influential in the development of education for women in rural areas.

Philanthropy 
Lady Cowdray was a patron of nursing and was associated with the Queen's Institute of District Nursing, establishing nursing services in rural parts of England and Scotland. She donated £100,000 to establish the Cowdray Hospital in Mexico City. When the Royal College of Nursing was established in 1916, Lady Cowdray became the Treasurer and Chairman of the Tribute Fund Committee for the Nation's Fund for Nurses, fundraising for the creation of a Benevolent Fund for Nurses and for the endowment of the Royal College of Nursing. In 1921 she funded the rebuilding along Henrietta Street in London for a headquarters for the Royal College of Nursing. She decided to create a social club for nurses and professional women, founding the Cowdray Club in 1922. She purchased a house on Cavendish Square from H. H. Asquith, and his wife Margot Asquith, for the club's headquarters.

Political career 
Lady Cowdray was a feminist and supporter of Women's suffrage in the United Kingdom. She was a member of the Women's Liberal Federation, serving as president from 1921 until 1923. She also served as the Honorary Treasurer of the Liberal Women's Suffrage Union. She was an early and deeply supportive member of the Women's Engineering Society.

Lady Cowdray served as a burgess in Aberdeen. She was elected by the Borough of Colchester to succeed her husband as the High Steward of Colchester. Her husband, Lord Cowdray, Weetman Pearson, also served fifteen years as a Liberal Party Member of Parliament from Colchester.  She is the only woman to have been High Steward of Colchester and held the office from 1927 until her death in 1932.  She suggested the idea of old age pensions to the British government around 1900, and the concept was eventually legislated.  She also instituted a system of disability pensions in England initially provided at her own expense, which were also eventually adopted by the British government.

Personal life 
Lady Cowdray was an avid art collector and patron of the arts. She commissioned the painting The Red Ruin by James Pryde. She was painted by John Singer Sargent and Sir William Orpen.

In November 1931, a thief broke into Lady Cowdray's home and stole £8,000 worth of jewellery from her granddaughter, Joan Pearson.

Lady Cowdray's great-grandson Iain Murray became the 10th Duke of Atholl. The duke's estate, Blair Castle, was in financial ruin at the time he inherited it. To protect it from being sold off, Lady Cowdray paid off the bank debt and gifted a large sum of money to her granddaughter Angela Pearson, the duke's mother, to set up a The Blair Charitable Trust. Her financial contributions toward saving Blair Castle were covered on the BBC Two documentary film The Last Dukes.

She was made a Dame Grand Cross of the Order of the British Empire in January 1932.

The poet, broadcaster and socialite Nadja Malacrida was her niece.

Death and legacy

Lady Cowdray died on 15 April 1932 at the Hôtel Ritz Paris.

On 2 June 1934, Queen Mary received £6,054 for the establishment of a memorial fund for Lady Cowdray.

References

1860 births
1932 deaths
Dames Grand Cross of the Order of the British Empire
British viscountesses
English suffragists
English feminists
English art patrons
English philanthropists
English women philanthropists
English socialites
Annie
Royal College of Nursing
Politicians from Bradford
Women's Engineering Society
Wives of knights